Moses Leota (born 20 July 1995) is a professional rugby league footballer who plays as a  and  for the Penrith Panthers in the NRL. He has played for both Samoa and New Zealand at international level.

Background
Leota was born in Auckland, New Zealand raised in Mount Roskill, Moses Leota moved to Sydney at the age of 13.
He is of Samoan descent and was raised in Penrith, New South Wales, Australia.

He played his junior rugby league for the St Mary's Saints, before being signed by the Penrith Panthers.

Playing career

Early career
In 2014 and 2015, Leota played for the Penrith Panthers' NYC team.

2016
In 2016, Leota graduated to the Penrith's Intrust Super Premiership NSW team. In round 14 of the 2016 NRL season, he made his NRL debut for Penrith against the Manly-Warringah Sea Eagles. In November, he extended his contract with Penrith from the end of 2017 until the end of 2019.

2017
Leota made 10 appearances for Penrith in the 2017 NRL season as the club finished 7th on the table.  Leota played in both finals games for Penrith as the club was eliminated in the second week by Brisbane.

2018
In round 4 of the 2018 NRL season, Moses “sole” Leota  scored his first NRL career try against North Queensland 33 - 14 win at 1300SMILES Stadium.  Leota made 20 appearances for Penrith in the 2018 NRL season as the club finished 5th and reached the elimination final before being defeated by Cronulla-Sutherland 21-20 at the Sydney Football Stadium.

2019
Leota made a total of 24 appearances for Penrith in the 2019 NRL season as the club finished 10th on the table and missed out on the finals for the first time since 2015.  It was a disappointing end to the season for Penrith as they had been tipped by many to reach the finals series and be one of the contenders for the premiership.  At one stage of the season, the club sat last on the table before a mid-season revival lifted them off the bottom to finish just outside the finals places.

2020
Leota played every game of the 2020 NRL season as the club claimed the Minor Premiership and reached the 2020 NRL Grand Final.  Leota played from the interchange bench in Penrith's 26-20 loss against Melbourne in the grand final.

2021
Leota played a total of 24 games and reached the milestone 100 games for Penrith in the 2021 NRL season including the club's 2021 NRL Grand Final victory over South Sydney which saw them claim their third premiership.

2022
Leota played 18 games for Penrith in the 2022 NRL season including the clubs 2022 NRL Grand Final victory over Parramatta.

2023
On 18 February, Leota played in Penrith's 13-12 upset loss to St Helens RFC in the 2023 World Club Challenge.

References

External links

Penrith Panthers profile
Panthers profile

1995 births
Living people
New Zealand national rugby league team players
New Zealand rugby league players
New Zealand emigrants to Australia
New Zealand sportspeople of Samoan descent
Penrith Panthers players
Rugby league props
Rugby league players from Auckland
Samoa national rugby league team players